Martín Delgado may refer to:

 Martín Teófilo Delgado (1858–1918), Filipino military leader
 Martín Delgado (football manager) (born 1949), Spanish football manager

See also
 Mario Martín Delgado (born 1972), Mexican politician